Anders Johnson (born 18 July 1962) is a retired Swedish ice hockey player. Johnson was part of the Djurgården Swedish champions' team of 1989, 1990, and 1991. Johnson made 278 Elitserien appearances for Djurgården.

References

External links

1962 births
AIK IF players
Djurgårdens IF Hockey players
Hammarby Hockey (1921–2008) players
Living people
Swedish ice hockey forwards